

Events

January events 

 January 1 – The classification and renumbering of all the rolling stock of the three constituent railways that formed South African Railways in 1910 is implemented.
 January 3 – Canadian Pacific Railway leases the Dominion Atlantic Railway in Nova Scotia.
 January 22 – Florida East Coast Railway opens the Key West Extension in Florida.

February events
 February 1 – Stamford Brook station opens serving District Railway and London and South Western Railway trains.
 February 7 – Official opening ceremonies are held for the Usambara Railway in German East Africa.
 February 11 – Togura Station, in Chikuma, Nagano, Japan, opens.
 February 27 – Pacific Great Eastern Railway (predecessor of the British Columbia Railway) is incorporated to build a line from Vancouver north to a connection with the Grand Trunk Pacific Railway at Prince George, British Columbia.

March events
 March 17 – First section of Italian Libya Railways ( gauge) opens from Tripoli.

April events
 April 15 – Metre gauge electrified section of Tramways de Nice et du Littoral opens from Menton to Sospel in the Alpes-Maritimes of France.

June events 

 June 1 – The first streetcars cross the new Lechmere Viaduct and run on the Causeway Street Elevated line in revenue service in Boston.
 June 2 – Chicago, Lake Shore and South Bend Railroad, predecessor of the Chicago South Shore and South Bend Railroad, begins "one-car" passenger service directly to the Chicago Loop.

August events 

September events
 September 17 – The Ditton Junction rail crash near Widnes in England kills 15.

November events
 November – The Royal Bavarian State Railways begins the process of standardising the railway electrification systems in German-speaking countries at 15 kV AC, 16.6 Hz.
 November 24 – The Pennsylvania Railroad’s premier Chicago to New York train is christened the Broad Way Limited (named for the railroad’s four-track main line, not the New York City Theater District).

Unknown date events
 First Э 0-10-0 steam locomotive introduced in Russia. This will become the world's largest class with around 14,000 built.
 The world’s first diesel locomotive designed for main line use, built by Gesellschaft für Thermolokomotiven Diesel-Klose-Sulzer GmbH for the Prussian state railways, Germany, receives trials on the Winterthur–Romanshorn line in Switzerland prior to delivery to Berlin for more trials in September. The unit has direct mechanical transmission with a weight of 95 tonnes, power of 883 kW and a theoretical maximum speed of 100 km/h but will not prove to be a commercial success.
 Berne gauge European standard loading gauge agreed at an international railway conference held and consequent convention signed in Bern, Switzerland.
 Portland Company completes the last freight car commercially manufactured for Maine narrow gauge railroads.
 Oliver Bury moves from the General Manager position at the Great Northern Railway in England to a directorship.

Births

March births
 March 14 – W. Graham Claytor, Jr., president of Amtrak 1982-1993 (died 1994).

Deaths

June deaths
 June 16 – Eli H. Janney, inventor of the knuckle coupler (born 1831).

July deaths 
 July 29 – William D. Washburn, first president of Soo Line Railroad 1883-1889, dies (b. 1931).

References
 (January 16, 2005), Biographies of chairmen, managers & other senior officers.  Retrieved February 10, 2005.
 Norfolk Southern Railway.  Retrieved February 22, 2005.
 (April 3, 2005), Significant dates in Canadian railway history.  Retrieved August 6, 2005.